The Laventan age is a period of geologic time (13.8 to 11.8 Ma) within the Middle Miocene epoch of the Neogene, used more specifically within the SALMA classification in South America. It follows the Colloncuran and precedes the Mayoan age.

Etymology 
The age is named after the Miocene Lagerstätte La Venta, where a rich biodiversity from the Middle Miocene has been recovered from the Honda Group.

Formations

Fossil content

Correlations 
The Laventan (13.8 to 11.8 Ma) correlates with:
 NALMA
 latest Barstovian (15.97-13.65 Ma)
 early Clarendonian (13.65-10.3 Ma)
 Californian ages
 Luisian (15.5-13.5 Ma)
 ELMA - Astaracian (15.97-11.608 Ma)
 CPS
 Badenian (13.65-12.7 Ma)
 Sarmatian (12.7-11.608 Ma)
 New Zealand stratigraphy - Southland epoch (15.9-10.92 Ma)
 Lillburnian (15.1-12.98 Ma)
 early Waiauan (12.98-10.92 Ma)
 Australian ages
 Bairnsdalian (15.0-10.5 Ma)
 Japanese ages
 Tozawan (15.97-13.5 Ma)
 NMAC - Tunggurian (13.65-11.1 Ma)

References

Bibliography 
Laventan
 

Honda Group, Colombia
 
 
 
 
 
 
 
 
 
 
 
 
 
 
 
 
 
 
 
 
 
 
 
 
 
 
 
 

Honda Group, Bolivia
 
 
 
 

Aisol Formation
 
 

Bahía Inglesa Formation
 
 
 
 
 
 
 
 
 
 
 
 
 

Capadare Formation
 
 

Choquecota and Mauri Formations
 

Cura-Mallín Group
 
 
 

Gran Bajo del Gualicho Formation
 

Ipururo Formation
 

Paraná Formation
 
 

Pebas Formation
 
 

Pisco Formation
 
 
 
 
 
 
 
 
 
 
 
 
 
 

Santa Inés Formation
 

Sincelejo Formation
 

Socorro and Urumaco Formations

Further reading 
 
 
 
 
 
 

 
Miocene South America
Neogene Colombia